Ich (also Romanized as Īch and Īj) is a village in Lasgerd Rural District, Sorkheh District, in the Central District of Sorkheh County, Iran. At the 2006 census, its population was 63, in 32 families.

References 

Populated places in Sorkheh County